4 is the fourth studio album by Slash featuring Myles Kennedy and the Conspirators, and Slash's fifth solo album overall. It was released on February 11, 2022, as the first album from the new Gibson Records label. The album was produced by country producer Dave Cobb in Nashville. The album was announced on October 20, 2021, with the release of the first track "The River Is Rising" as a single.

Background
Though Slash reunited with Guns N' Roses in 2016, he has still continued with his solo work, this being the second studio album release in that time period. Writing for the album started during the 2018-19 Living the Dream Tour. Slash stated of the album, "There’s two or three songs on the record that were written during the pandemic; everything else was written before".

Looking to record the album in a different style than previously, the band travelled to Nashville to record at RCA Studio A with Dave Cobb. Cobb shared the band's vision of recording the tracks live together, a tactic they had not employed on the previous albums. Slash noted that "we did it more or less live, and the mistakes are all in there. It’s the sound of the five of us just jamming together in one room."

The band faced the complications of COVID-19 not only in a delay of getting together to record the album, but also with the recording itself. Myles Kennedy was the first of several band members to contract the virus. He points out that you can hear his congestion on the opening track but states that these anomalies make the album interesting because "We just let those imperfections lay."

Accolades

Track listing

Personnel
Slash featuring Myles Kennedy and the Conspirators
Slash – lead guitar, talkbox
Myles Kennedy – lead vocals
Todd Kerns – bass guitar, backing vocals
Brent Fitz – drums, percussion
Frank Sidoris – rhythm guitar

Charts

References

2022 albums
Slash (musician) albums
Albums produced by Dave Cobb